Alexander Skachkov (November 21, 1960, Yerofey Pavlovich, Skovorodinsky District) is a Russian political figure, deputy of the 8th State Duma. 

From 2003 to 2004, Skachkov was the head of the East Siberian Railway. In 2011, he was appointed head of the East Siberian Directorate of Infrastructure of the Central Directorate of Infrastructure. From 2017 to 2021, he was the head of the Trans–Baikal Railway. In 2019, Skachkov became a member of the United Russia. Since September 2021, he has served as deputy of the 8th State Duma.

References

1960 births
Living people
United Russia politicians
21st-century Russian politicians
Eighth convocation members of the State Duma (Russian Federation)